The London Declaration concerning the Laws of Naval War is an international code of maritime law, especially as it relates to wartime activities, proposed in 1909 at the London Naval Conference by the leading European naval powers, the United States and Japan, after a multinational conference that occurred in 1908 in London. The declaration largely reiterated existing law, but dealt with many controversial points, including blockades, contraband and prize, and showed greater regard to the rights of neutral entities.

The declaration was signed by most of the great powers of the day: Austria-Hungary, France, Germany, Italy, Japan, Russia, the United Kingdom, and the United States. (It was also signed by the Netherlands and Spain.)
However, no state ever ratified the declaration and consequently it never came into force. The United States insisted that the belligerent nations fighting in World War I abide by the Declaration, while the British and Germans ignored it.

The British geostrategist and naval historian Sir Julian Corbett argued strongly against the provisions of the Declaration, which sought to outlaw 'general capture' of enemy commerce on the high seas during wartime. In his earlier 1907 essay 'The Capture of Private Property at Sea', he argued that the curtailment of the Royal Navy's right to seize enemy shipping would have a detrimental impact on Britain's ability to wage economic warfare against a continental enemy, economic warfare being the single most important function of the Navy, in his view. The arguments he set out gained currency within the Navy and British government, and would eventually prevail with Britain's decision not to ratify the Declaration and the successful waging of maritime economic warfare, including 'general capture', against Germany during the First World War.

In any case, the London Declaration was greatly deficient in referring only to surface ships and completely ignoring submarine warfare, which was to play a major role in both World Wars. By its very nature, a submarine can neither capture an enemy (or neutral) vessel nor give any warning before attacking; a submarine's only chance of success is to launch a surprise attack intending to sink the targeted vessel. Thus, by definition, a submarine could not abide by many of the rules of conduct made for surface vessels.

Notes

References 

 John Westlake, International Law: War (London, 1910)
 American Journal of International Law (supplement, New York, 1909)
 Andrew Lambert (ed.) 21st Century Corbett: Maritime Strategy and Naval Policy for the Modern Era. (Annapolis, 2017) Ch. 3.

External links 

 Declaration concerning the Laws of Naval War, icrc.org (includes full text and signatory states and dates)
 Declaration concerning the Laws of Naval War, 208 Consol. T.S. 338 (1909), Human Rights Library, University of Minnesota

Law of the sea treaties
International humanitarian law treaties
Treaties concluded in 1909
Blockades
Unratified treaties
1909 in London